Sergio Garrote Muñoz (born 27 July 1979) is a Spanish Para-cyclist who represented Spain at the 2020 Summer Paralympics.

Career
Garrote Muñoz represented Spain in the men's road time trial H2 event at the 2020 Summer Paralympics and won a gold medal. He also won a bronze medal in the men's road race H1–2 event.

References

Living people
1979 births
Spanish male cyclists
Cyclists at the 2020 Summer Paralympics
Medalists at the 2020 Summer Paralympics
Paralympic medalists in cycling
Paralympic gold medalists for Spain
Paralympic bronze medalists for Spain
Cyclists from Barcelona
20th-century Spanish people
21st-century Spanish people